The Desert Showcase (formerly the Desert Cup, the Desert Diamond Cup, the Mobile Mini Sun Cup, and the Visit Tucson Sun Cup), is a preseason soccer tournament hosted by Phoenix Rising FC of the USL Championship and FC Tucson of USL League One. The tournament is sponsored by the Tucson Convention and Visitors Bureau, known as Visit Tucson.

Beginning in 2011, the inaugural Desert Cup featured two Major League Soccer (MLS) clubs, Sporting Kansas City and New York Red Bulls.  In the years since, the number of participating MLS clubs has continued to grow, with the 2018 Mobile Mini Sun Cup featuring eleven MLS clubs ‒ nearly half of the league's total membership.

History 
The first edition of the tournament, held at Hi Corbett Field, a former baseball spring training stadium saw sellout crowds with international stars such as Thierry Henry, Rafael Márquez, and Omar Bravo playing.

The second edition was held from February 22 through March 3, paralleling several other preseason tournaments ahead of the 2012 American outdoor domestic league seasons. Three new clubs competed in the 2012 edition of the tournament: defending MLS Cup champions LA Galaxy, Real Salt Lake, and the New England Revolution joined the New York Red Bulls, who returned for their second Desert Cup appearance. The 2012 Desert Diamond Cup moved to Kino Veterans Memorial Stadium and saw clubs play a total of four matches each.

Phoenix Rising FC purchased FC Tucson on October 11, 2017. On December 5, Phoenix Rising FC and FC Tucson announced that they would co-host the tournament and that it would be renamed the Mobile Mini Sun Cup, with Mobile Mini as sponsor. Games will be played at North Stadium at the Kino Sports Complex as well as Phoenix Rising Soccer Complex. A record 11 teams will participate in the 2018 tournament.

In 2020, the tournament will be renamed the Visit Tucson Sun Cup and will host Sporting Kansas City, Real Salt Lake, New York Red Bulls, Houston Dynamo and Columbus Crew SC along with Phoenix Rising FC.

Sponsors
Desert Diamond Casinos & Entertainment (2012–2017)
Mobile Mini Storage Solutions (2018–2019)
Visit Tucson (2020–present)

Results

See also 
 Carolina Challenge Cup – A preseason soccer tournament held in Charleston, South Carolina hosted by USL Pro side, Charleston Battery.
 Walt Disney World Pro Soccer Classic – Held at the ESPN Wide World of Sports Complex at the Walt Disney World Resort near Orlando, Florida. The tournament is hosted also by MLS side, Orlando City.
 Hawaiian Islands Invitational – 2012 event, also a property of ESPN and featuring teams from Australia, Japan, and South Korea

References

External links 
 Phoenix Rising FC & FC Tucson - Tournament Hosts
Facebook Page

 
Soccer cup competitions in the United States
American soccer friendly trophies
Phoenix Rising FC
FC Tucson